Édouard-Jean, 3rd Baron Empain (7 October 1937 – 21 June 2018) 
was a French-Belgian industrialist, best known by the general public for his kidnapping in 1978.

Between 1969 and 1981, Baron Empain was CEO of the Schneider group (Schneider-Empain). The Baron was the son of Jean, 2nd Baron Empain, and the grandson of Édouard Louis Joseph, 1st Baron Empain. He married the Italian Silvana Betuzzi in 1957 by whom he had two daughters and a son: they were divorced shortly after Empain's kidnapping. He lived in the suburbs of Paris with his second wife Jacqueline (née Ragonaux), a former model, whom he married in 1990.

Kidnapping 
At the time of his kidnapping, Édouard-Jean Empain was the 40-year-old heir to a substantial fortune, a notable industrialist and the director of the Schneider group since 1969. He was one of France's captains of industry, heading a group that comprised almost 150 companies and 130,000 employees, with an annual turnover of 25 billion francs. Notable members of the Schneider Group included Framatome (nuclear reactors), Creusot-Loire (metallurgy) and Spie Batignolles (construction).

His kidnapping profoundly affected him and he declared that he was never the same afterwards.

Capture on Avenue Foch 

On Monday, January 23, 1978, at approximately 10:30am, Édouard-Jean, 3rd Baron Empain, was picked up as usual from his home at 33 Avenue Foch, a prestigious address in the 16th arrondissement of Paris, a stone's throw from the Arc de Triomphe.

The Baron's chauffeured car, a Peugeot 604, was intercepted at a junction some 50 metres after it had left his home. A moped slid across the road, faking an accident in order to bring his car to a halt next to a parked van. Once the car had stopped several armed men removed the driver from the vehicle and bundled him into the van, while the Baron was quickly handcuffed and the kidnappers made off in his car. The Baron's car was found some hours later in an underground parking structure but contained no usable fingerprints.

Despite the lack of detailed evidence provided by witnesses, the circumstances of the kidnapping were rapidly made known to the public. In the hope of recovering the Baron, the police put in place traffic stops throughout Paris and its suburbs but to no avail.

Initial investigation 
Empain's driver Jean Denis, who was released close to Porte Maillot, told investigators that he had been handcuffed at gunpoint and thrown into the back of a van, and as such had not seen the faces of the kidnappers. He overheard one of them speaking in German, however, which led the authorities to think that the crime might have been committed by an extreme-left group affiliated with the Red Army Faction. That scenario was persuasive as the kidnapping of Empain came on the heels of the kidnapping and the execution of the German industrialist Hanns Martin Schleyer by the Red Army Faction.

The police quickly installed themselves in Empain's family home. Presuming that the kidnappers would contact the family, they tapped the phones and kept the house under surveillance so that the family would not try to deal directly with the kidnappers.

French president Valéry Giscard d'Estaing, who was close to Empain at the time, advised Interior Minister Christian Bonnet and Attorney General Alain Peyrefitte to put together a crisis team. Peyrefitte called on the public to 'denounce the criminals', and  Socialist Party First Secretary François Mitterrand talked of the 'decline of civilisation'. A team similar to that of the government was set up by the Schneider group to represent its interests in the affair. The group comprised René Engen (Empain's right-hand man) and Robert Badinter (Empain's lawyer) as well as the former director general of the police, Max Fernet, who was employed by the group as a 'technical consultant'.

First message from kidnappers 

On Tuesday January 24, 1978, the day after the kidnapping, the radio station RTL received a call from a group purporting to be responsible:

The Armed Core Groups for Popular Autonomy (NAPAP) was an extreme-left, French guerrilla organisation which had claimed responsibility for the kidnapping of a number of foreign diplomats. Although this lead supported the initial police theory, which was echoed in the press, that the kidnapping was politically motivated, the family had in fact received an anonymous telephone call from the real kidnappers which they relayed to the police. The call, which came from the Rue Anjou, close to the headquarters of the Schneider group, demanded that someone go to the Gare de Lyon to collect a message left in locker 595. One of the members of the group, along with the police, proceeded directly to the station where they found the Baron's identity card, a number of letters from the kidnappers, a note from the Baron (including a message to his wife) and a small package.

The kidnappers demanded 80 million francs in ransom and seemed extremely determined. The package the police found in the locker contained the Baron's left little finger preserved in formaldehyde. The family were increasingly unnerved as the letter stipulated that further body parts would follow if the ransom was not paid.

Six days wait 
Six days passed without news from the kidnappers. The police widened their investigation into the Baron's private life in order to discover whether the kidnapping had motives other than financial gain.

Numerous routes of inquiry were followed. The Baron's passion for poker to which he devoted many of his evenings and a considerable sum of money suggested a possible mafia connection. The investigation revealed that the Baron had lost 11 million francs a few weeks earlier and had to take out a loan to cover the debt. The press quickly got wind of these revelations and the hypothesis that the Baron had staged his own kidnapping to cover his gambling debts was forwarded. It was the Baron's numerous affairs, however, which grabbed the public's attention and served to damage his previously untarnished reputation.

Affected by these revelations, the Empain family became increasingly hostile towards journalists. Despite the family's silence, the press maintained a constant presence outside the Baron's home. To add to the media interest, the police refused to confirm the amputation of the Baron's finger which provoked widespread speculation.

At the same time, the kidnappers sent a further letter to the Baron's eldest daughter Patricia, who was married to American oil and ranch heir Terrell Braly. Written in the Baron's own hand and dictated by the kidnappers, the letter specified the procedure for the transfer of the ransom and reminded the family not to alert the police. The family and the Empain-Schneider group did not immediately warn the police, preferring to handle the situation themselves. However the increasing silence of those close to the Baron excited the suspicion of the police who placed the family under heightened surveillance. This surveillance allowed the police to discover the existence of secret negotiations between the group and the kidnappers with the group having the aim of reducing the sum demanded from 80 million francs to 30 million. The family and the group both thought that it would be better to pay the ransom whereas the police refused to contemplate this course of action as setting a dangerous precedent. After much discussion, the group allowed themselves to be convinced by the police to pay a fake ransom, which was a great disappointment to the family, especially the Baron's wife, Silvana Empain, who feared it would put her husband's life in peril.

Relative calm period 
Four weeks after the kidnapping, on Monday February 20, 1978 a telephone call placed by the kidnappers to the Schneider group's headquarters indicated that the ransom had been reduced to 40 million francs without further negotiations.

The rendezvous set by the kidnappers was to take place two days later at Megève, a winter resort in Haute-Savoie. A radio communication system was rapidly deployed in the area by the police to facilitate the operation. The police examined the numerous possible methods the kidnappers could use for their ingress and egress and in order that the unmarked police cars used were not spotted their Parisian licence plates were changed.

Inspector Jean Mazzieri, a skilled martial artist, was chosen to carry out the ransom delivery under the guise of Mr. Mazo, a fictitious aide of the Baron.

Megève episode 
On the day of the rendezvous, Wednesday February 22, 1978, Jean Mazzieri made his way to the Le Chalet du Mont d'Arbois hotel where he was supposed to receive a telephone call from Félix le Chat who would ask for Jacques Dupond and arrange another meeting place for the exchange. He had with him two holdalls containing a mix of bank notes and paper designed to mimic on cursory inspection the ransom of 17 million Swiss francs. The area was under surveillance by numerous plain clothes police who were ready to intervene if necessary. The kidnappers did not call however and the operation was cancelled later that evening.

Contact 
Seven weeks after the kidnapping, on Friday March 17, 1978, a Belgian businessman who was close to the Baron, received a telephone call at his Brussels office. The kidnappers wished to contact René Engen and had called Salik to avoid the telephone surveillance that the French police had put in place. Engen immediately returned from a business trip to Luxembourg and went to the arranged rendezvous at the Hilton hotel in Brussels where he was to await a telephone call. From this call he learned that a new exchange would be arranged and he would receive the details in the post. The letter which he received, written by Empain at the behest of his kidnappers, warned Engen that it was "life or death" for the Baron if the police were involved. The police were nonetheless informed and rapidly organised an operation to oversee the new rendezvous, which was to take place on Thursday March at 15:00 at Fouquet's restaurant on the Champs-Élysées.

Parisian excursion 
On the day of the rendezvous, it was again officer Jean Mazzieri who was to carry the ransom, still under the guise of the Baron's aide. He was to expect a telephone call from Charlotte Corday who would ask for a Mr. Marat and question the respondent to ensure that the police were not involved. A further rendezvous was arranged at the  Le Murat café where Mazzieri was to receive another telephone call. Throughout his journey Mazzieri was discreetly followed by armed police officers. At the second café Mazzieri was told to look for a road map at the bottom of a bin near to one of the entrances to the Porte d'Auteuil metro station. The map instructed Mazzieri to proceed to a third café, Le Rond Point, in Porte d'Orléans and defined a precise route as well as a maximum speed of 50 km/h. The map also stipulated that the car should take a service road, which had been specially opened by the kidnappers to make sure that Mazzieri was not followed by the police. Mazzieri could at all times contact the other police officers by radio to update them on his location.

A second road map hidden at Le Rond Point sent Mazzieri to Antony where he was to enter a car park and exchange his vehicle for one left by the kidnappers. This meant Mazzieri could no longer update his colleagues by radio. The glovebox of the car contained the address of a new meeting place, the Les Trois Obus café, situated near to the Porte de Saint-Cloud metro station. From there he received instructions to proceed to the Hilton hotel in Orly. Here, after six hours of travel around Paris and its suburbs, he received a call from the kidnappers who, using the darkness as a pretext, told Mazzieri that it was too late to undertake the exchange and rescheduled it for the following day.

Arrest 

In the early evening of the following day, Friday March 24, 1978, while waiting at the bar of the Orly Hilton, Mazzieri received a telephone call instructing him to fill up his petrol tank and prepare for a further excursion. Upon his return to the bar, Mazzieri received a second call telling him to head on to the A6 motorway in the direction of Paris and stop on the hard shoulder at emergency telephone point B16.

Soon after the car had come to a stop on the hard shoulder a tow truck pulled in behind Mazzieri, believing him to have broken down. Mazierri got out of the car to tell the driver of the tow truck to move along and it was at this moment that two of the kidnappers, who had been hiding nearby, made off in Mazzieri's car. The kidnappers stopped the car a few hundred metres further down the hard shoulder next to a service door in the 20m high soundproofing wall which lines the motorway. This door had already been opened by the kidnappers to aid their escape and they boobytrapped it with a grenade to prevent pursuit by the police. The kidnappers had also stationed an accomplice armed with a submachine gun on top of the wall to cover their escape and this man opened fire on the police as they attempted to pursue the kidnappers. A firefight then took place between the kidnappers and the police in which one of the kidnappers was killed and another arrested. Two police officers were wounded, inspectors Berux and Lailheugue. The man who was killed was Daniel Duchâteau, a convicted bank robber, the man who was arrested called himself Alain and was at that time unknown to the police.

Release 
On Sunday March 26, 1978, the police interrogated the captured kidnapper who called himself Alain Caillol and tried to induce him to call the kidnappers and tell them to release their hostage. The police eventually convinced him to contact his accomplices after guaranteeing that they would not be arrested. Police commissioner Ottavioli proposed that Alain call the kidnappers from his personal phone, which was not under surveillance. Alain called twice telling his accomplices "it's over, the ransom has been seized, we must avoid carnage and release the baron". After these calls Alain told the police that "it's 99% certain: the release of the baron is close". A tape recorder attached to the telephone allowed the police to identify the number using the Touch-Tone waveform and trace the call.

Two hours later, before the call was traced, the baron was released. After several months of investigation all of the kidnappers were arrested apart from one who was killed in a firefight during his arrest. Over the course of the investigation, 24,000 vehicles were stopped and 12,000 homes were visited. The kidnapping lasted 63 days.

See also
List of kidnappings
List of solved missing person cases

In popular culture 
 Books
 
 
 
 
 

 Documentaires
 L'Enlèvement du baron Empain - Faites entrer l'accusé (2005). First broadcast in France on France 2 10 April 2005 Official site.
 Paroles d'otages by Jean-Claude Raspiengeas and Patrick Volson (1989). The story of three hostages: Gerhard Vaders, Édouard-Jean Empain and Jean-Paul Kauffmann, VHS, TF1 Vidéo, 1990. First broadcast in France on TF1 in 1990.
 L'affaire Empain, TF1 Journal de 20H00 27/06/1979, reconstruction of the kidnapping, INA
 Édouard Jean Empain, Cartes sur table, A2  18/09/1978, INA

 Film
 Rapt (2009), by Lucas Belvaux, was inspired by the kidnapping of Édouard-Jean, 3rd Baron Empain

Notes

References

1937 births
2010s missing person cases
2018 deaths
Barons Empain
Formerly missing people
Kidnapped Belgian people
Kidnapped businesspeople
Missing person cases in Belgium
People from Budapest
Belgian people of American descent